Gary Carpenter (born 1951) is a British composer, of concert music and film scores, and also operas and musicals. He is a Visiting Professor at the Royal Academy of Music and the Royal Northern College of Music. He was Associate Music Director for the film The Wicker Man, putting together the ensemble Magnet for the occasion.

Carpenter's piece Dadaville premiered at the First Night of the Proms, on 17 July 2015.

Works

Orchestra
Satie Variations (1993)
Dadaville (2015)

Ensemble
Da Capo (1981)
Die Flimmerkiste (1983)
Ein Musikalisches Snookerspiel (1991) for wind octet
Pantomime (1995) for woodwind orchestra
Distanza (2004)
After Braque (2006)

Instrumental
 Clarinet Sonata (1991)
Van Assendelft's Vermeer (2004) for clavichord

Dance
Children's Games (1978) for Jiří Kylián, electronic score, work includes also music from the Kindertotenlieder by Mahler
Interactions (1980) for Christopher Bruce

Musical
The Streets of London (1980), libretto by Ian Barnett

Opera
The Lost Domain (1984), three acts, libretto by Ian Barnett based on Le Grand Meaulnes
Doggone (1990), one act, libretto by Simon Nicholson
Nyanyushka (2007), one of six pieces making up Blind Date, libretto by Simon Nicholson

Radio drama
The One Alone (1987), verse drama by Iris Murdoch

Soundtracks
The Wicker Man (1973), continuous soundtrack by Paul Giovanni and Carpenter including folk song material
The Hitchhiker's Guide to the Galaxy (2005)
Ravenous, Damon Albarn, orchestration with Michael Nyman

References

External links

1951 births
Living people
British multi-instrumentalists
British film score composers
British musical theatre composers
British male classical composers